"Stormy" is a hit song by the Classics IV released on their LP Mamas and Papas/Soul Train in 1968. It entered Billboard Magazine October 26, 1968, peaking at #5 on the U.S. Billboard Hot 100 chart and #26 Easy Listening. The final line of the chorus has the singer pleading to the girl:  "Bring back that sunny day". The single, along with the prior release of "Spooky" and, soon after, the release of "Traces", formed a trio of solid hits for the band.

Chart history

Weekly charts

Year-end charts

Santana cover 

"Stormy" was a hit for Santana when it appeared on their 1978 album Inner Secrets. Their version peaked at #32 in the US and #19 Easy Listening. It was also a hit in Canada.

Chart history

Weekly charts

Year-end charts

External links 
 Classics IV - "Stormy"/"24 Hours of Loneliness" (1968) single at Discogs.com

References 

1968 songs
1968 singles
1979 singles
Imperial Records singles
Columbia Records singles
Songs written by J. R. Cobb
Songs written by Buddy Buie
Classics IV songs